The spotted rainbowfish (Glossolepis maculosus) is a species of rainbowfish in the subfamily Melanotaeniinae. It is endemic to the river systems of the Markham and Ramu Rivers in Papua New Guinea. Papua New Guinea. This species was described by Gerald R. Allen in 1981 with the type locality given as a small tributary of the Omsis River, about 22 kilometers west of Lae in the  Markham River system, Papua New Guinea.

References

Glossolepis
Freshwater fish of Papua New Guinea
Taxonomy articles created by Polbot
Taxa named by Gerald R. Allen
Fish described in 1981